The Arizona Assassins were a women's semi-professional American football team founded in 2010. The Assassins were members of the Women's Football Alliance. Based in Gilbert, Arizona, the Assassins played their home games on the campus of Washington High School (Phoenix, Arizona).

Season-By-Season

|-
|2010 || 3 || 5 || 0 || 3rd American South Pacific || ––
|-
|2011 || 6 || 3 || 0 || 2nd American Southwest || 
|-
|2012 || 0 || 8 || 0 || 4th American South Pacific || ––
|-
|2013 || 0 || 7 || 0 || 5th American South Pacific || ––
|-
|2014 || 0 || 7 || 0 || 3rd American Pacific South || ––
|-
|2015 || 3 || 5 || 0 || 2nd American Pacific South || ––
|-
!Totals || 12 || 35 || 0 ||  ||

2010

Season schedule

2011

Standings

Season schedule

** = Won by forfeit

2012

Season schedule

References

External links
 Arizona Assassins official website

American football teams in Arizona
Women's Football Alliance teams
Sports in Phoenix, Arizona
American football teams established in 2010
American football teams disestablished in 2015
2010 establishments in Arizona
2015 disestablishments in Arizona
Women's sports in Arizona